Cochylis piana is a species of moth of the family Tortricidae. It is found in Mongolia, China (Inner Mongolia, Liaoning, Shaanxi, Xinjiang), Kazakhstan, Tadjikistan, Uzbekistan, Kyrgyzstan, Afghanistan, Iran and Russia.

References

Moths described in 1919
Cochylis